Kilpin is a village and civil parish in the East Riding of Yorkshire, England.

The civil parish is formed by the villages of Kilpin and Kilpin Pike and the hamlets of Balkholme, Belby, Howdendyke and Skelton. Kilpin lies within the Parliamentary constituency of Haltemprice and Howden an area that mainly consists of middle class suburbs, towns and villages. The area is affluent, placed as the 10th most affluent in the country in a Barclays Private Clients survey, and has one of the highest proportions of owner-occupiers in the country. According to the 2011 UK census, Kilpin parish had a population of 339, a decrease on the 2001 UK census figure of 357.

In 1823 Kilpin was in the parish of Howden and the Wapentake and Liberty of Howdenshire. Population at the time was 318, and included four farmers and a yeoman.

References

External links

Villages in the East Riding of Yorkshire
Civil parishes in the East Riding of Yorkshire